Malick Fall (born 17 November 1968) is a former Senegal international football forward who played for Manshia Bani Hassan.

Career
Born in Matam, Fall moved to France as a youth and played for several clubs in Ligue 2, including Amiens SC, SC Abbeville and Angers SCO.

Fall made several appearances for the Senegal national football team, and played at the 1992 African Cup of Nations finals.

References

External links
Profile at Racingstub.com

1968 births
Living people
Senegalese footballers
Senegalese expatriate footballers
Senegal international footballers
1992 African Cup of Nations players
Ligue 2 players
Amiens SC players
Angers SCO players
Stade Brestois 29 players
SC Abbeville players
Association football forwards
Senegalese expatriate sportspeople in France
Expatriate footballers in France
Senegal A' international footballers
2009 African Nations Championship players